Henry Alexander Swieca (born 1957) is the co-founder and former Chief Investment Officer of Highbridge Capital Management and the founder of Talpion Fund Management.

Early life
Swieca grew up in a Jewish family in Washington Heights, Manhattan, New York.  He is the son of two Holocaust survivors from Poland who emigrated from France in 1955.  Both his parents died when he was nineteen.
Swieca's mother died of Lou Gehrig's disease when he was 19. Within months, his father died from a heart attack. Through an uncle who was a dentist and avid stock investor, Swieca was introduced to financial markets. Now orphaned, Swieca turned to the stock market to pay for his education and that of his younger brother. With $50,000 of inheritance, he bought 1,000 shares in Warner Communications, nearly his entire wealth at the time. He then used the shares as collateral to invest in option based trading strategies, and in the process gained a strong understanding of risk management while also generating additional investment income.  He held the Warner shares for two years, doubling his money.

Swieca was later accepted into Columbia Business School on a two-year deferment. He used that time to travel and work abroad, and accept a job at Merrill Lynch — a position he found by knocking on the doors of investment banks throughout Manhattan. "I told them I was hungry and would work for very little money," Swieca said. "I had no connections; I had to hustle and struggle."

Career
Swieca began his career trading stocks with $50,000 that his parents left for him.  He was able to support his brother through Medical School with the money he made from investing.  After graduation, Swieca worked at Merrill Lynch, becoming one of the founding traders on the New York Futures Exchange where he traded equity index options.  He later joined Dillon Read as an institutional investor advisor.

Swieca Group at E.F. Hutton

In 1984, Swieca and Glenn Dubin formed the Dubin and Swieca Group at E.F. Hutton.  They pioneered the integration of traditional securities investments and derivative investment strategies.

Highbridge Capital Management
In 1992 Swieca started Highbridge Capital Management with childhood friend Glenn Dubin. Swieca served as the firm's chief investment officer from inception to its acquisition.   They sold a 55% stake to JP Morgan Chase in 2004 and substantially all remaining shares in 2009.  As Highbridge CIO, he guided the firm through multiple market cycles as it achieved one of the best risk adjusted returns in the hedge fund industry.

Talpion Fund Management
Swieca currently runs his family office, Talpion Fund Management, which invests proprietary money in a hedge fund-like structure as well as direct fixed income investing. In 2012 he seeded Clearline Capital, an equity investor. The family office has also branched into direct real estate investing, as well as venture capital under the name QB1 Ventures.

Philanthropy
Swieca is on the board of The National World War II Museum and the board of The Columbia Graduate School of Business.

Personal
Swieca is married to Israeli American Estee Tobaly with whom he has four children. Swieca practices Orthodox Judaism. Swieca owns a summer residence in Atlantic Beach, NY.

References

Columbia Business School alumni
Jewish American philanthropists
American people of Polish-Jewish descent
Living people
Stony Brook University alumni
American billionaires
1957 births
Chief investment officers
21st-century American Jews